Löhlein is a German surname. Notable people with the surname include:

Henning Löhlein (born 1965), German illustrator
Hermann Löhlein (1847-1901), German obstetrician and gynecologist

German-language surnames